Acoustic Live is a live album released by English synthpop duo Erasure in 2006. It is a double-CD set that is a recording of a concert appearance performed on 19 April 2006 at the Shepherd's Bush Empire in London. This concert was an acoustic performance to promote the band's 2006 album Union Street. It was recorded and distributed in conjunction with Live Here Now and was available only through direct order from Mute Records and as a digital download via Live Here Now. Because of this limited availability, the album was ineligible for the UK Albums Chart.

The album cover art for Acoustic Live is identical to that of Union Street, except for the title written across the center.

Track listing
all songs written by Vince Clarke and Andy Bell, except "Against My View" by Elizabeth Stratton

Disc one
 "Home" — 5:46  	 	 	 	
 "Boy" — 4:19 				
 "Victim of Love" — 3:21		
 "Stay with Me" — 5:41 				
 "Love Affair" — 5:09 				
 "Oh L'amour" — 3:13 		
 "Alien" — 4:19 				
 "Blue Savannah" — 6:09 				
 "Spiralling" — 2:51 				
 "How Many Times?" — 3:42

Disc two
 "Sometimes" — 5:47 				
 "Tenderest Moments" — 5:36 				
 "Ship of Fools" — 4:01 				
 "Love to Hate You" — 5:41 				
 "Against My View" — 3:51 				
 "Piano Song" — 3:50 				
 "Rock Me Gently" — 5:58 				
 "Stop!" — 4:15 				
 "Chains of Love" — 6:08 				
 "A Little Respect" — 4:00

Personnel

Band
 Vince Clarke – Guitars / Mandolin / Melodica
 Andy Bell – Vocals
 Valerie Chalmers – Vocals / Percussion
 Jill Walsh – Vocals / Harmonium / Melodica / Recorder
 Ben Wittman – Percussion
 Smith Curry – Pedal steel / Dobro guitar
 Richard Hammond – Double Bass
 Steve Walsh – Guitars

Crew
 Andy Whittle – Tour Manager
 Troy Stewart – Backline tech
 Roy Speer – Backline tech
 Craig Donaldson – Monitor Engineer
 Matt West – FOH Engineer
 Nic Ayer – Lighting Director

Erasure live albums
2006 live albums
Mute Records live albums